Hōshun Yamaguchi (山口蓬春, Yamaguchi Hōshun) (1893-1971) was a Japanese Nihonga painter and designer.

He received a commission to paint a piece for the new Tokyo Imperial Palace. The piece titled “Kaede (maples)” is a large painting measuring 2.74x2.5 metres. 
It is located on the cedar door of the east corridor of the Seiden hall. Opposite of it on the other side is “Sakura (cherry)” by Meiji Hashimoto.

The preparatory drawing for the panel at a 4:1 scale dating to 1967 is in the Yamatane Museum of Art in Tokyo.

The Yamaguchi Hōshun Memorial Hall exhibits many of his works.

See also 
 Seison Maeda (1885–1977), one of the leading Nihonga painters
 List of Nihonga painters

References

External links 
 Yamaguchi Hōshun Memorial Hall

1893 births
1971 deaths
Recipients of the Order of Culture
People from Hokkaido
20th-century Japanese painters